Phundelal Singh Marko is an Indian politician and a member of the Indian National Congress party.

In 2013 & 2018 he became a M.L.A. of  M.P. Legislative assembly & he represents Pushprajgarh constituency.

Political career
1984-84:-  1st student president elected at gov. college Pushprajgarh.

1985-87:-  Vice president youth congress Pushprajgarh.

1987-93:-  Govt. assistant teacher at H.S. school Rajendragraam governed by tribal department.

1994-99:-  Elected member of district panchayat Shahdol, district-Shahdol.

1999-04:-  Elected member & Vice-President of district panchayat Shahdol.

2000-01:- President block congress Committee Pushprajgarh.

2001-04:- President M.P. Aadiwasi vikas parishad district-Shahdol.

2004-08:-  Elected member of district panchaayat Anuppur, district-Anuppur.

2007-10:- Block incharge of Manrega in Pushprajgarh.

2012-13:- Mahaamantri M.P. Aadiwasi vikas parishad Bhopal.

2004 to continuous:- President M.P. Aadiwasi vikas parishad district-Anuppur.

2007 onwards:- Vice-president district congress committee Anuppur.

2007 onwards:-  In charge of Congress party in Pushprajgarh Vidhansabha.

2013-18:- M.L.A. Pushprajgarh Vidhansabha.

2018-  :-   M.L.A. Pushprajgarh Vidhansabha.

Political Views
He supports Congress Party's Ideology.

See also
Madhya Pradesh Legislative Assembly
2013 Madhya Pradesh Legislative Assembly election

References

External links

1965 births
Living people
Indian National Congress politicians from Madhya Pradesh